Chapter V: Underrated is the sixth studio album by American singer Syleena Johnson. It was released by Shanachie Records on September 27, 2011 in the United States. Her debut with the label, the album peaked at number 49 on the US Top R&B/Hip-Hop Albums chart. The album's lead single, "A Boss," was released on iTunes on June 21, 2011.

Critical reception

AllMusic editor Jonathan Widran found that the focus on Chapter V: Underrated was "blissfully more on compelling, groove-oriented songwriting and Johnson's powerful, emotional vocals than star-studded invites. She asserts her ability to get back on her feet on the brief horn-fired title track intro, then engages in a sassy, En Vogue-like exchange about seeking an equal mate on the funked-up "A Boss." The girl power vibe intensifies on the hip and clever clap-along "Label Me." Johnson balances the danceable side with her always potent balladry [...] Johnson may be Underrated, but she's never sounded better."

Track listing

Charts

Release history

References

External links

2011 albums
Syleena Johnson albums